Uroš Čarapić (born 24 September 1996) is a Serbian professional basketball player for Borac Čačak of the Basketball League of Serbia and the ABA League.

Professional career 
Čarapić grew up with a youth system of his hometown club Borac. In the 2013–14 season, he made his Serbian League debut. In the 2019–20 season, Borac named him their new team captain. In May 2020, he signed a three-year contract extension.

National team career 
In July/August 2021, Čarapić was a member of the Serbia U-18 that won a silver medal at the FIBA Europe Under-18 Championship in Konya, Turkey. Over six tournament games, he averaged one point and one rebound per game.

References

External links 
 Player Profile at ABA League
 Player Profile at eurobasket.com
 Player Profile at realgm.com
 Player Profile at proballers.com
 Player Profile at kkborac.rs

1996 births
Living people
ABA League players
Basketball League of Serbia players
Basketball players from Čačak
KK Borac Čačak players
Serbian men's basketball players